Vyacheslav Andreyevich Kalashnikov (born 12 May 1985) is a Russian former footballer.

References

1985 births
Living people
People from Petrovsky District, Stavropol Krai
Russian footballers
FC Rotor Volgograd players
FC Saturn Ramenskoye players
FC SKA Rostov-on-Don players
FC Amkar Perm players
Russian Premier League players
FC Khimki players
Association football defenders
FC Dynamo Bryansk players
Sportspeople from Stavropol Krai